The 2022 European Table Tennis Championships were held in Munich, Germany, from 13 to 21 August 2022, as part of the 2022 European Championships.

Medalists

Medal table

Participating nations 
225 players from 39 nations.

References

External links 
European Table Tennis Union
Munich 2022
Results book

 
2022
European Championships
Table Tennis
European Table Tennis Championships
International sports competitions hosted by Germany
Sports competitions in Munich
European Table Tennis Championships
2022 European Championships